TBC1 domain family member 10A is a protein that in humans is encoded by the TBC1D10A gene.

Model organisms

Model organisms have been used in the study of TBC1D10A function. A conditional knockout mouse line, called Tbc1d10atm2a(EUCOMM)Wtsi was generated as part of the International Knockout Mouse Consortium program — a high-throughput mutagenesis project to generate and distribute animal models of disease to interested scientists — at the Wellcome Trust Sanger Institute. Male and female animals underwent a standardized phenotypic screen to determine the effects of deletion. Twenty three tests were carried out and one significant phenotype was reported. Homozygous mutant male adults had abnormal clinical chemistry, including decreased circulating LDL cholesterol, alanine transaminase and alkaline phosphatase levels.

References

Further reading

Genes mutated in mice